This is a glossary of locksmithing terms.

Glossary

References

External links 

Locksmithing
Locksmithing
Wikipedia glossaries using description lists